This is a list of countries by potato production from 2016 to 2020, based on data from the Food and Agriculture Organization Corporate Statistical Database. The estimated total world production for potatoes in 2020 was 359,071,403 metric tonnes, up 1.2% from 354,812,093 tonnes in 2019. China was the largest producer, accounting for 21.8% of world production, followed by India at 14.3%. Dependent territories are shown in italics.

Production by country

>1,000,000 tonnes

100,000–1,000,000 tonnes

10,000–100,000 tonnes

<10,000 tonnes

Notes

References 

Potato production
Potato
Potato production
 Country
Potatoes